"Can I Get A..." is a song recorded by American rapper Jay-Z, featuring Ja Rule and Amil. It was released on Def Jam's Rush Hour Soundtrack in promotion of the film Rush Hour, but also appears on Jay-Z's third album Vol. 2... Hard Knock Life as its first single. The song is produced by Irv Gotti and Lil' Rob. The song is notable for popularizing a young Amil and Ja Rule, as well as becoming one of Jay-Z's most commercially successful singles at the time, peaking at number 19 on the Billboard Hot 100. 

The chorus of the original song starts with "Can I Get A 'Fuck You'?", but it was censored to "Can I Get A 'What What'?" and ".. whoop whoop" for radio airplay. The song deals with the question of whether Jay-Z's girlfriend would stick with him if he weren't wealthy.

The vinyl "Can I Get A..." single was released in 1998 with two tracks that do not feature Jay-Z: Ja Rule's "Bitch Betta Have My Money" and Wu-Tang Clan's "And You Don't Stop". The CD single was released in 1999 with two different tracks that do not feature Jay-Z: Case and Joe's "Faded Pictures" as well as Dru Hill and Redman's "How Deep Is Your Love". All songs were included in the Rush Hour soundtrack.

Janet Jackson's 2004 song "Strawberry Bounce", from her album Damita Jo, samples "Can I Get A...".

VH1 ranked "Can I Get A..." at No. 57 in the network's 100 Greatest Songs of the 90s.

Chris Penn appears in the video as a bartender. Jermaine Dupri also makes a cameo.

Formats and track listings

CD
 "Can I Get A..." – 5:13
 "Faded Pictures" – 3:48
 "How Deep Is Your Love" – 3:58

Vinyl

A-side
 "Can I Get A..." (radio edit)
 "Bitch Betta Have My Money" (radio edit)
 "And You Don't Stop" (radio edit)

B-side
 "Can I Get A..." (TV track)
 "Bitch Betta Have My Money" (TV track)
 "And You Don't Stop" (TV track)

Charts

Year-end charts

See also
List of songs recorded by Jay-Z

References

1998 singles
1999 singles
Amil songs
Jay-Z songs
Ja Rule songs
Song recordings produced by Irv Gotti
Songs written by Irv Gotti
Songs written by Jay-Z
Roc-A-Fella Records singles
1998 songs
Def Jam Recordings singles
Songs written by Ja Rule